James Plummer may refer to:

James Henry Plummer (1848–1932), Canadian financier
James Pratt Plummer, grandson of James W. Parker whose family were kidnapped by Native Americans
James W. Plummer (1920–2013), American Director of the National Reconnaissance Office
 Jim Plummer, Canadian-born electrical engineer